Jefferson County, Virginia has existed twice in the U.S. state of Virginia's history. Formed in 1780, and 1801, respectively, both counties were named for one of that state's most celebrated residents, Thomas Jefferson, and each was separated from Virginia due to the creation of a new state, partitioned in accordance with Article IV, Section 3, Clause 1 of the United States Constitution. The two counties continued in existence as:
 Jefferson County, Kentucky, separated when Kentucky was admitted to the Union in 1792.
 Jefferson County, West Virginia, separated when West Virginia was admitted to the Union in 1863.

See also
 Former counties, cities, and towns of Virginia

Pre-statehood history of Kentucky
Pre-statehood history of West Virginia
Former counties of Virginia
1780 establishments in Virginia
1801 establishments in Virginia